Statistics of Austrian Staatsliga in the 1964–65 season.

Overview
It was contested by 14 teams, and Linzer ASK won the championship.

League standings

Results

References
Austria - List of final tables (RSSSF)

Austrian Football Bundesliga seasons
Austria
1964–65 in Austrian football